

Events
March – construction in Queenstown of St Colman's Cathedral, Cobh, concludes with completion of the spire.
4 April – 25,000 National Volunteers assemble at the Phoenix Park, Dublin. John Redmond takes the salute from under the statue of Charles Stewart Parnell on Sackville Street.
5 April – at the National Volunteers convention at the Mansion House, Dublin, John Redmond praises their response to World War I.

25 May – the Prime Minister of the United Kingdom forms the Asquith coalition ministry, a national wartime coalition government of twelve Liberals, eight Unionists and one Labour member. In Dublin the Irish Parliamentary Party approves John Redmond's decision not to join.
29 July – Republicans, led by Patrick Pearse, take over the Gaelic League at its Dundalk conference. Douglas Hyde resigns as its president.
1 August – O'Donovan Rossa is buried at Glasnevin Cemetery in Dublin, and Pearse delivers the graveside oration ("Ireland unfree shall never be at peace").
26 December – the Irish Republican Brotherhood Military Council decides to stage an Easter Rising in 1916.
The Elim Pentecostal Church is founded in Monaghan by Welsh evangelist George Jeffreys.

Arts and literature
1 February – Helen Waddell's first play, The Spoiled Buddha, is premiered at the Opera House, Belfast, by the Ulster Literary Society.
 Francis Ledwidge's poems Songs of the Fields published.
 James Stephens' poems The Adventures of Seumas Beg: the Rocky Road to Dublin and Songs from the Clay are published.
 The first dramatic film made in Ireland, Fun at Finglas Fair, is directed by F. J. McCormick. It is never released as all prints are destroyed in the Easter Rising of April 1916.

Sport

Football
Irish League
Winners: Belfast Celtic
Irish Cup
Winners: Linfield 1–0 Belfast Celtic

Births
11 January – Paddy Mayne, international rugby union footballer and decorated soldier (died 1955).
13 January – Kit Ahern, Fianna Fáil TD (died 2007).
21 January – Andy O'Brien, Fine Gael senator from County Cavan (died 2006).
25 January – Liam Cunningham, Fianna Fáil TD (died 1976).
7 February – Mark Clinton, Fine Gael TD, Minister for Agriculture and MEP (died 2001).
15 February – Sam Kydd, actor (died 1982).
15 March – Micho Russell, tin whistle player and collector of traditional music and folklore (died 1994).
9 April – Leonard Wibberley, author (died 1983).
2 May – George Harrison, member of the Provisional Irish Republican Army and alleged gun-runner (died 2004).
3 May – Walter Macken, novelist, dramatist and actor (died 1967).
17 May – Oisín Kelly, sculptor (died 1981).
6 August – Tom O'Reilly, Cavan Gaelic footballer and independent TD for Cavan 1944–1948 (died 1995)
28 August – Patrick Hennessy, painter (died 1980).
16 September – Eddie Filgate, Fianna Fáil TD (died 2017).
16 October – Jim Young, Cork hurler (died 1992).
18 September – James Tully, Labour Party TD and Cabinet Minister (died 1992).
7 November – Bill Hayes, soccer player (died 1987).
20 December – Noel Browne, politician, Cabinet Minister (died 1997).
Full date unknown
John Graham, Irish Republican Army activist in the 1940s (died 1997).
Willie Murphy, Cork hurler (died 1977).

Deaths
20 January – Arthur Guinness, 1st Baron Ardilaun, businessman, politician, and philanthropist (born 1840).
26 January – Michael Sullivan, physician, professor and politician in Canada (born 1838).
28 January – David Dickson Rogers, politician in Ontario (born 1845).
14 February – Cornelius Coughlan, soldier, recipient of the Victoria Cross for gallantry in 1857 at Delhi, India (born 1828).
24 April – Frederick William Hall, soldier, posthumous recipient of the Victoria Cross for gallantry in 1915 during the Second Battle of Ypres in Belgium (born 1885).
7 May – on board 
 O'Brien Butler, composer (born 1861).
 Hugh Lane, established Dublin's Municipal Gallery of Modern Art (born 1875).
29 June – Jeremiah O'Donovan Rossa, Fenian leader (born 1831).
2 August – William Abraham, Irish Nationalist MP (born 1840).
21 August – Gerald Robert O'Sullivan, recipient of the Victoria Cross for gallantry in 1915 at Gallipoli, Turkey (born 1888).
21 August – Thomas Pakenham, 5th Earl of Longford, peer and soldier (born 1864).
25 September – Joseph Lynch, cricketer (born 1880).
10 October – Albert Cashier, soldier in the Union Army during the American Civil War, physically female, but lived as a man (born 1843).
21 December – Violet Florence Martin, author (born 1862).

References

 
1910s in Ireland
Ireland
Years of the 20th century in Ireland
Ireland